Jessica Brizeida López Arocha (born January 22, 1986) is a Venezuelan artistic gymnast who competes for the Venezuela national team. She competed at the 2008, the 2012 and the 2016 Summer Olympics, where she qualified to the uneven bars final, becoming the first Venezuelan gymnast to qualify for an individual apparatus final, where she placed sixth.

Career
In NCAA gymnastics, Lopez competed for the University of Denver.

She qualified to compete as an individual at the 2008 Olympics in Beijing.

In 2009, she competed at the 2009 World Artistic Gymnastics Championships.

In March 2010, she won the bronze medal at the American Cup. At the end of March, she won the gold medal in the all around, uneven bars, and floor exercise at the South American Games. She won medals in Moscow, Porto, and Ghent, and at the Glasgow World Cup. In September, she went to compete at the Pre-Panamerican Games, where she won two silver medals (uneven bars and balance beam) and one bronze medal (all around). In October, she competed at the 2010 World Championships, where she qualified for the all-around finals and finished in the tenth place, the best showing ever for a Venezuelan gymnast.

Lopez qualified to compete as an individual at the 2012 Summer Olympics in London. She finished 18th overall. She carried the Venezuelan flag in the closing ceremony of the Olympic Games.

At the 2014 World Championships, she did not qualify to any individual event finals, but finished eighth in the all around, her highest worlds finish. Afterwards she competed at the Central American and Caribbean Games, placing first all around, beam and bars. She competed at the Stuttgart World Cup a few weeks later and won silver in the all around.

She competed at the 2015 American Cup and placed 4th, which secured her winning the FIG World Cup series.

She qualified to compete at the 2016 Olympics in Rio de Janeiro, where she finished seventh in the all around and sixth on uneven bars.

References

External links

Biography at the University of Denver

1986 births
Living people
Denver Pioneers women's gymnasts
Gymnasts at the 2007 Pan American Games
Gymnasts at the 2008 Summer Olympics
Gymnasts at the 2012 Summer Olympics
Gymnasts at the 2016 Summer Olympics
Gymnasts at the 2015 Pan American Games
Olympic gymnasts of Venezuela
Pan American Games silver medalists for Venezuela
Sportspeople from Caracas
Venezuelan female artistic gymnasts
Pan American Games medalists in gymnastics
Central American and Caribbean Games gold medalists for Venezuela
Central American and Caribbean Games silver medalists for Venezuela
Central American and Caribbean Games bronze medalists for Venezuela
Competitors at the 2010 Central American and Caribbean Games
South American Games gold medalists for Venezuela
South American Games bronze medalists for Venezuela
South American Games medalists in gymnastics
Competitors at the 2010 South American Games
Central American and Caribbean Games medalists in gymnastics
Medalists at the 2015 Pan American Games
21st-century Venezuelan women